Arazan (Arabic: ارزان) is a small town and rural commune in Taroudant Province of the Souss-Massa region of Morocco. At the time of the 2014 census, the commune had a total population of 7999 people living in 1422 households.

The town was home to a significant population of Berber Jews until their departure to Israel in the mid-1960s. A synagogue preserved by the local inhabitants was restored in 2010.

References

Populated places in Taroudannt Province
Rural communes of Souss-Massa